Neodeightonia is a genus of fungi in the family Botryosphaeriaceae. There are three known species.

External links

Botryosphaeriaceae